Linda Thompson Walker (born 1960) is a federal magistrate judge for the United States District Court for the Northern District of Georgia and formerly a nominee for a seat on that court. Her nomination was returned to the President on December 17, 2011, pursuant to the rules of the Senate.

Early life
Walker received her J.D. in 1989 from the University of Georgia School of Law, her M.S. in 1987 from Atlanta University, and her B.S. in 1983 from Southern University. From 1989 to 1990, Walker served as a law clerk to Judge G. Ernest Tidwell of the U.S. District Court for the Northern District of Georgia. From 1990 to 1992 she worked as a litigation associate at the law firm of Webb & Daniel in Atlanta, Georgia. Walker served as Deputy County Attorney (1992–1997) and as County Attorney (1997–1999) for Fulton County, and as director of the County’s Board of Registration and Elections in 1999. Since 2000 she has been a magistrate judge.

Nomination to federal district court
Walker was recommended for a judgeship on the United States District Court for the Northern District of Georgia by Republican Senators Saxby Chambliss and Johnny Isakson. She had also been considered by a Democratic search committee led by former Representative Buddy Darden, but she was not recommended by that committee. On January 26, 2011, President Barack Obama nominated Walker to fill the Northern District of Georgia vacancy created by the elevation of Judge Beverly B. Martin to a seat on the United States Court of Appeals for the Eleventh Circuit. Her nomination went on hold because Senators Saxby Chambliss and Johnny Isakson refused to support another nominee for another seat on the same district, Natasha Perdew Silas. Walker was part of a packaged deal with Silas, a Democrat and the choice of the Democratic delegation to Congress from Georgia. Her nomination was returned to the President on December 17, 2011, pursuant to the rules of the Senate.

See also
 Barack Obama judicial appointment controversies

References 

1960 births
Living people
People from Gloster, Mississippi
Southern University alumni
Clark Atlanta University alumni
University of Georgia alumni
African-American judges
American women judges
United States magistrate judges
21st-century African-American people
21st-century African-American women
20th-century African-American people
20th-century African-American women